Fremont General Corporation was a Santa Monica, California based holding company for Fremont Investment & Loan, an industrial bank that was one of the largest subprime mortgage lenders in the country during the early and mid 2000s.

Background
The company was founded in 1963 and incorporated in 1972 under the name Lemac Corporation. It changed its name in March 1973 to Fremont General Corporation and served as a holding company.  It went public in 1977. The company primarily owned insurance businesses during its early years, including  property, casualty and life insurance. Their workers' compensation insurance business was the seventh largest in the United States. 

The insurance operations were gradually disposed of, with the last, Fremont Indemnity, discontinued in 2001. The state of California took over supervision of the worker's compensation business in 2000, and the company agreed to cease its insurance operations, with the state assuming conservatorship in 2003.  

The company was headed by James A. McIntyre, who served as the company's CEO  from 1976 to 2004, and as chairman of the board from 1989 to January 2008.

Subprime lending business
In 1990, the company acquired Tomar Financial Corp, which owned two state-chartered  industrial banks, Investors Thrift & Loan and Liberty Thrift & Loan.  At the time, the two banks had combined assets of about $182 million.  The two banks were merged and their name changed to Fremont Investment & Loan, based in Brea, California.  

The bank's assets grew rapidly, to a peak of $12.7 billion at the end of 2006, with deposits of $10.1 billion. The bank was among the largest subprime mortgage lenders in the U.S., ranking sixth in 2005 and 2006 in the dollar volume of subprime mortgage originations.  The bank was also among the largest issuers of subprime mortgage-backed securities in the U.S., ranking eighth in 2005 and fourth in 2006 in the dollar volume of subprime MBS issuances.  

The company had a  net loss of $202 million in 2006, and a net loss of $856 million in the first nine months of 2007.  Fremont Investment & Loan was forced out of the subprime lending business in 2007 after their regulators, the Federal Deposit Insurance Corporation, filed a cease and desist notice against the bank.  

The bank also sold their commercial lending business in May 2007 to iStar Financial. The company moved their headquarters to Brea, California in 2008.

Bankruptcy
Fremont General Corp. filed for Chapter 11 bankruptcy in June 2008.  Fremont Investment & Loan's assets were sold off and it surrendered its state banking charter. The bank's retail business, including its deposits, were sold in 2008 to CapitalSource Inc. in Chevy Chase, Maryland (which operated as CapitalSource Bank). The bank's mortgage-servicing rights were sold to Litton Loan Servicing (owned at the time by Goldman Sachs, now owned by Ocwen).  

In June 2009, the company agreed to a legal settlement with the State of Massachusetts regarding predatory lending practices.  They agreed to pay $10 million in consumer relief, civil penalties and costs. The company had made adjustable-rate mortgage loans without considering the customers ability to pay after the initial teaser rate had expired. The company also faced a class action lawsuit in 2008.

The company emerged from bankruptcy in 2010 and was acquired by Signature Group Holdings LLC. Fremont General Corp.'s name was changed to Signature  Group Holdings Inc.  Its primary asset was almost $1 billion in net operating loss tax carryforwards. Investor Sam Zell acquired control of the company in 2013, and the name was changed to Real Industry, Inc. after its acquisition of Real Alloy, an aluminum recycling company.

References

Subprime mortgage lenders
Subprime mortgage crisis
Mortgage lenders of the United States
Financial services companies of the United States
Companies that filed for Chapter 11 bankruptcy in 2008